Bat's Head is a chalk headland on the Dorset coast in southern England, located between Swyre Head and Durdle Door to the east, and Chaldon Hill and White Nothe to the west.  At the base of the headland is the small Bat's Cave.

References

External links 
 Bat's Head entry in Ian West's Geology of the Wessex Coast

Headlands of Dorset
Jurassic Coast